= Syria Today magazine =

Syrian magazine

Syria Today is a private-sector monthly English-language magazine in Syria. It was founded in October 2004, with Kinda Kanbar as the magazine's executive director.
